The women's shot put event  at the 1974 European Athletics Indoor Championships was held on 9 March in Gothenburg.

Results

References

Shot put at the European Athletics Indoor Championships
Shot